Catriona Macdonald is a musician and teacher from Shetland and is considered to be one of the world's leading traditional fiddle players.

Background 
Macdonald started studying fiddle with Dr Tom Anderson MBE in 1981 at age 11 (she considers herself to be a late starter), was a founding member of Shetland's Young Heritage and won the Shetland Young Fiddler of the Year competition in 1983.  In 1992 Macdonald won the BBC Radio Two Young Tradition Award and went on to study voice for four years at the Royal College of Music in London. She lives in Scotland and focuses both on an her international music playing and an academic career .

Macdonald is an active teacher with a passion for sharing her knowledge of traditional fiddle techniques and vernacular. Professionally she is Head of Music Performance and Degree Program Director for British Folk at Newcastle University as well a Doctoral candidate. Catriona has worked as a tutor and course assessor for the Scottish Music Degree at the Royal Conservatoire of Scotland in Glasgow, and has taught at Universities in Norway, Ireland, Denmark, Canada and Australia as well as Stirling and Highlands and Islands in Scotland. Catriona regularly tutors at a variety of summer schools and residential courses around the world including "Burwell Bash", "Shetland Fiddle Frenzy", "Folkworks" and "Blazin' in Beauly" (Blazin' Fiddles' own summer school).

Catriona tours and performs at many International Festivals such as Celtic Colours, Kaustinen Folk Music Festival, Celtic Connections and many others  As well as her own band, Macdonald currently plays with international members of fiddle band String Sisters (Annbjørg Lien, Liz Knowles Liz Carroll, Emma Härdelin and Mairéad Ní Mhaonaigh ) as well as touring in duo with Annbjørg Lien and also Timo Alakotila.  She has been a member of The Unusual Suspects and was a member of Scottish fiddle band Blazin' Fiddles until 2011.

Discography

Solo albums 
 2000 — Bold
 2007 — Over the Moon

Groups and collaborations 
 1994       Opus Blue (with Ian Lowthian)
 1998       Hodden Grey Ian Bruce
 2001       A Shot at Glory soundtrack (with Mark Knopfler)
 2004       The Old Style (Blazin Fiddles)
 2005       Magnificent Seven (Blazin Fiddles)
 2005       Live in Scotland   The Unusual Suspects
 2006       Strange But True  Kathryn Tickell
 2007       Blazin' Fiddles Live (Blazin Fiddles)
 2007       Live - String Sisters
 2008       Stramash  Colin Steele 
 2010       Big Like This  The Unusual Suspects
 2011       Thursday Night in the Caley (Blazin Fiddles)
 2013       Vamm (Vamm - Patsy Reid, Catriona Macdonald and Marit Fält)
 2017.      Between Wind and Water (String Sisters)

Awards 

1992  BBC Radio Two Young Tradition Award for Best Musician in Britain

Polls 2001 "Top 5 World Music Albums of the Year"  fRoots Magazine 2001

"Top 10 Folk Albums of the Year 2000"

MOJO Magazine 2001 (Folk Album of the Month, April 2000)

MOJO Magazine 2001 Recognised artist "Album of the Year and Musician of the Year"

BBC2 Folk Awards 2001 (Included in the released compilation cd The Folk Awards on Topic records)

"Scottish Folk Album of the Year" CD NOW

Scottish Traditional Music Awards'

2004 Live Band  (Blazin Fiddles)

2005 Album of the Year  (Blazin Fiddles)

References

External links 

 Official MySpace page
 Catriona Macdonald profile at NME

People from Shetland
Scottish folk musicians
Shetland music
Shetland fiddlers
Living people
Blazin' Fiddles members
String Sisters members
21st-century violinists
Year of birth missing (living people)